Jacky Douglas Cupit (born February 1, 1938) is an American professional golfer who has played on both the PGA Tour and the Senior PGA Tour (now known as the Champions Tour).

Born and raised in Longview in the piney woods of east Texas, Cupit attended the University of Houston. As a member of the Cougars golf team, he earned All-American honors in 1959 and 1960, turned pro in 1960, and joined the PGA Tour in 1961. His older brother, Buster, was a professional golfer who played mainly in Texas and Oklahoma.

Cupit played on the PGA Tour from 1961 to 1973 and had four victories. His first came at the Canadian Open in 1961, helping him to win the PGA's Rookie of the Year award. His last tour win came in 1966 at the Cajun Classic. Cupit's best finish in a major was runner-up at the U.S. Open in 1963, when he and Arnold Palmer lost to Julius Boros in a three-way  playoff.

After reaching the age of 50 in 1988, Cupit played part-time on the Senior PGA Tour. He currently is the Golf Professional Emeritus at the Links at Land's End in Yantis, Texas.

Professional wins (4)

PGA Tour wins (4)

PGA Tour playoff record (1–2)

Results in major championships

Note: Cupit never played in The Open Championship.

CUT = missed the half-way cut (3rd round cut in 1962 PGA Championship)
WD = withdrew
"T" indicates a tie for a place

Summary

Most consecutive cuts made – 4 (1963 U.S. Open – 1964 PGA)
Longest streak of top-10s – 1 (four times)

References

External links

American male golfers
Houston Cougars men's golfers
PGA Tour golfers
PGA Tour Champions golfers
Golfers from Texas
People from Longview, Texas
1938 births
Living people